Ramnarong Sawekwiharee (born December 18, 1996) is a Thai Taekwondo athlete who won two bronze medals at the 2015 World Taekwondo Championships and 2017 World Taekwondo Championships.

References

External links
 

Living people
1996 births
Ramnarong Sawekwiharee
Taekwondo practitioners at the 2014 Asian Games
Asian Games medalists in taekwondo
Ramnarong Sawekwiharee
Medalists at the 2014 Asian Games
Taekwondo practitioners at the 2018 Asian Games
Southeast Asian Games medalists in taekwondo
Ramnarong Sawekwiharee
Competitors at the 2013 Southeast Asian Games
Competitors at the 2017 Southeast Asian Games
Competitors at the 2019 Southeast Asian Games
Medalists at the 2019 Summer Universiade
World Taekwondo Championships medalists
Asian Taekwondo Championships medalists
Universiade medalists in taekwondo
Universiade bronze medalists for Thailand
Taekwondo practitioners at the 2020 Summer Olympics
Ramnarong Sawekwiharee
Ramnarong Sawekwiharee
Ramnarong Sawekwiharee